Gary Lockerbie (born 15 November 1982) is an English professional golfer.

Career
Lockerbie was born in Penrith, Cumbria. He had a successful amateur career, including wins in the English Amateur and the Lytham Trophy, before turning professional after representing Great Britain and Ireland in the 2005 Walker Cup.

In his first season as a professional on the second tier Challenge Tour in 2006, Lockerbie finished inside the top 15 in the rankings to graduate to the European Tour for 2007. He failed to win enough money in his rookie season on the European Tour to retain his playing status for the following year. In 2008 he claimed his first professional victory at the Kazakhstan Open, the Challenge Tour's richest regular season tournament. That win helped him to second place on the Challenge Tour Rankings and a return to the European Tour for 2009. In 2009 he finished 108th in the Race to Dubai to keep his card for the 2010 season.

Amateur wins
2000 Carris Trophy
2003 English Amateur
2005 Lytham Trophy

Professional wins (1)

Challenge Tour wins (1)

Results in major championships

Note: Lockerbie only played in The Open Championship.
CUT = missed the half-way cut

Team appearances
Amateur
European Amateur Team Championship (representing England): 2005 (winners)
Walker Cup (representing Great Britain & Ireland): 2005

See also
2006 Challenge Tour graduates
2008 Challenge Tour graduates
2012 Challenge Tour graduates

References

External links

English male golfers
European Tour golfers
Sportspeople from Cumbria
People from Penrith, Cumbria
1982 births
Living people